Gallotia simonyi, also known as Simony's lizard, is a species of lacertid (wall lizard) that was found on many of the Canary Islands. The species was once present throughout much of the islands, but one of the two subspecies is extinct, while the other, the Roque Chico de Salmor giant lizard is now confined to a few small areas of cliff with sparse vegetation. It is currently restricted to the southern end of the Risco de Tibataje in la Fuga de Gorreta, located between Guinea and the so-called Paso del Pino (an area of about four hectares). The species was also successfully reintroduced to the Roque Chico de Salmor in 1999, and subsequent reintroductions have taken place at Julan and at la Dehesa.(Miras & Pérez-Mellado 2005b)

It is omnivorous. It eats plants – notably verode and Lavandula abrotanoides – as well as insects (ARKive 2006). Mating begins in May and 5 to 13 eggs are laid from June until the end of August. Their eggs hatch after 61 days.

Etymology
The specific name, simonyi, is in honor of Viennese naturalist Oskar Simony (1852–1915).

Systematics
Two subspecies are recognised:
 Roque Chico de Salmor giant lizard, Gallotia simonyi simonyi – extinct (c.1930s)
 El Hierro giant lizard or Hierro giant lizard, Gallotia simonyi machadoi

The population of this species is about 300 to 400 animals in the wild (including re-introduced populations), and it is classified as critically endangered by the 2006 IUCN Red List. This lizard's major threat is predation by feral cats, and possibly also by dogs and rats.

References

External links

 lacerta.de: Gallotia simonyi machadoi image gallery. Retrieved 2007-FEB-25.

Gallotia
Reptiles of the Canary Islands
Reptiles described in 1889
Taxa named by Franz Steindachner